C. crispa may refer to:

 Chloraea crispa, an orchid species in the genus Chloraea
 Clematis crispa, a climbing plant species in the genus Clematis
 Clethra crispa, a plant species in the genus Clethra native to northwestern South America
 Cousinia crispa, a sunflower species in the genus Cousinia
 Cryptogramma crispa, a fern species
 Cyanea crispa, a plant species endemic to Hawaii
 Cyathula crispa, a flowering plant species in the genus Cyathula

See also 
 Crispa (disambiguation)